"Not Now" is a song by American rock band Blink-182 that was released on November 28, 2005. It was the lone single from the group's first compilation album, Greatest Hits (2005), because it was the only song on the compilation that was previously unreleased in the US. The song had been composed and recorded during the sessions that produced the group's self-titled 2003 album (it first appeared as a bonus track on the UK version of that album). "Not Now" would be the group's last single as a band before their four-year hiatus from 2005 to 2009.

"Not Now" was released to radio on October 18, 2005. The song reached number 18 on Billboard Hot Modern Rock Tracks chart and number 30 on the UK Singles Chart.

Background
The song concerns death and miscommunication. The song's guitar riffs were compared to the Descendents by journalist Joe Shooman, and are interspersed by verses containing a church organ.

"Not Now" was first released for download on the iTunes Music Store on the day of the album's release. It was included as a bonus track on the UK edition of Blink-182, although it is unclear why it was originally left off the track listing of the international edition. The song was also included on Atticus: ...Dragging the Lake, Vol. 3 (2005), a compilation album released by DeLonge's clothing company, Atticus Clothing. Both of these physical releases are a slightly shorter edit, where the bridge is shortened, making it roughly 15 seconds shorter.

When the song was selected to be a single for the band's post-breakup Greatest Hits album, it ran into trouble with the trio's management, which were split between DeLonge (who remained with original Blink manager Rick DeVoe) and Hoppus/Barker (who switched to Irving Azoff to handle their new project, +44). The Azoff camp lobbied for the Hoppus-led "Another Girl, Another Planet" as the lead single, while DeVoe argued for "Not Now", which eventually won.

Music video
The music video features clips of the band's past music videos, concerts, and tours. There are two released versions of this video, but the only significant difference between them is that different clips from all of their videos are used.

There is also a third, possibly unofficial, video; this is seen on Australia's Channel [V]. In this version, the video is black and white and is made up of some of the band's previous music videos as well as some footage of their live performance in the 2000 Big Day Out during the bridge of the song.

Format and track listing 

US Enhanced CD (2005)
 "Not Now" – 4:09
 "I Miss You" (Live In Minneapolis) – 3:57
 "I Won't Be Home for Christmas" – 3:16
 "Not Now" (music video)

UK CD single (2005)
 "Not Now" – 4:09
 "Dammit" – 2:45

UK 7" single part 1 (2005)
 "Not Now" – 4:09
 "Dammit" – 2:45

UK 7" single part 2 (2005)
 "Not Now" – 4:09
 "All the Small Things" – 2:52

Charts

Weekly charts

Release history

References

Bibliography

External links
 

Blink-182 songs
2005 singles
2003 songs
Geffen Records singles
Island Records singles
Songs written by Mark Hoppus
Songs written by Tom DeLonge
Songs written by Travis Barker